Epsilon Apodis, Latinized from ε Apodis, is the Bayer designation for a star in the southern circumpolar constellation of Apus. It has an apparent visual magnitude of 5.06, which is bright enough to be viewed from dark suburban skies.

Based upon a stellar classification of B3 V, this is a massive, B-type main sequence star that is generating energy through the fusion of hydrogen at its core. Epsilon Apodis has more than six times the mass of the Sun and nearly four times the Sun's radius. It is radiating 1,614 times as much luminosity as the Sun from its outer envelope at an effective temperature of 17,050 K. At this heat, it has a blue-white glow that is a characteristic of B-type stars.

It is spinning rapidly, with a projected rotational velocity of 255 km/s giving a lower bound for the azimuthal velocity along the equator. Epsilon Apodis is classified as a Gamma Cassiopeiae type variable star and its brightness varies between magnitudes 4.99 and 5.04.

Naming

References

External links
 Simbad
 Image Epsilon Apodis

124771
Apus (constellation)
Apodis, Epsilon
B-type main-sequence stars
Gamma Cassiopeiae variable stars
Be stars
070248
5336
Durchmusterung objects